Integrin beta-5 is a protein that in humans is encoded by the ITGB5 gene.

Interactions
Integrin, beta 5 has been shown to interact with PTK2, Annexin A5 and PAK4.

Functions 
ITGB5 encodes a subunit of integrin that can interact with several alpha chains to form a variety of integrin heterodimers. It also plays a potential role in intercellular communication during tumor progression and metastasis.

Clinical significance

Research
Elevated levels of ITGB5 have been found in patients with autosomal dominant osteopetrosis type II, a rare disease of bones.

References

Further reading

External links
ITGB5 Info with links in the Cell Migration Gateway 

Integrins